SP4 may refer to:

 SP4, an album by Sneaker Pimps 
 Sp4 transcription factor, a human gene
 Savoia-Pomilio SP.4, a reconnaissance and bomber aircraft built in Italy during the First World War
 The Saint Patrick's Day Four
 Service pack 4 in computing
 Specialist Four (incorrectly called Specialist 4th class), a former enlisted rank of the U.S. Army, now simply Specialist
 a model of steam toy made by British manufacturer Mamod
 a 7.62×42mm silent pistol cartridge
 Surface Pro 4, a laplet by Microsoft